In the Tentacles of the North is a 1926 American silent adventure film directed by Louis Chaudet and starring Gaston Glass, Alice Calhoun and Joseph W. Girard. Two ships, on a journey lead by Captin Van Horn, become trapped in ice in the Arctic Ocean. The crews have to abandon their cargo from whaling, and go out searching for a group of migrating eskimos. This is their only chance at survival. It was based on a story by James Oliver Curwood.

Cast
 Gaston Glass as Francis Wainfield 
 Alice Calhoun as Rac Brown 
 Joseph W. Girard as Dan Blake 
 Alan Roscoe as Capt. Van Horn 
 Al Ferguson as Cole 
 T. Hohai as Eskimo Chief
 Frank Baker as First Mate

References

Bibliography
 Munden, Kenneth White. The American Film Institute Catalog of Motion Pictures Produced in the United States, Part 1. University of California Press, 1997.

cinema, PELICULAS MUDAS / Silent. “In the Tentacles of the North (1926, EE. UU.), Louis Chaudet.” YouTube, YouTube, November 29, 2017, www.youtube.com/watch?v=oN91gCwdZIU.

“Tentacles of the North.” IMDb, IMDb.com, www.imdb.com/title/tt0017451/?ref_=nm_knf_t3.

External links

1926 films
1926 adventure films
American adventure films
Films directed by Louis Chaudet
American silent feature films
Rayart Pictures films
Seafaring films
American black-and-white films
Films set in the Arctic
Films based on works by James Oliver Curwood
1920s English-language films
1920s American films
Silent adventure films